Independencia is a central department of Chaco Province in Argentina.

The provincial subdivision has a population of about 20,500 inhabitants in an area of  1,871 km², and its capital city is Campo Largo, which is located around 1,229 km from the Capital federal.

Settlements
Avia Terai
Campo Largo
Napenay

References

1921 establishments in Argentina
Departments of Chaco Province